Broadway Dancer (foaled 16 February 1972) was an American-bred, French-trained Thoroughbred racehorse and broodmare. Between June 1974 and August 1975 she raced six times, winning twice. As a two-year-old she won on her debut before being narrowly beaten in the Prix Robert Papin before recording an emphatic six-length success in the Prix Morny. Although she did not race again in 1974 she was the highest-rated juvenile filly of the season in both the official French Handicap and the independent Timeform ratings. After running third when favourite for the Poule d'Essai des Pouliches on her three-year-old debut she ran poorly in two subsequent races and was retired from racing. She was not a success a broodmare.

Background
Broadway Dancer was a small bay mare with a white star and a white sock on her left hind leg bred in Kentucky by the Nickols Brothers. She was one of many important winners sired by the Canadian-bred Northern Dancer, who won the Kentucky Derby in 1964 before becoming one of the most successful breeding stallions in Thoroughbred history. Broadway Dancer's dam Broadway Melody, was a high-class racemare who finished second in the Queen Mary Stakes in 1966 and the Jersey Stakes in the following year. Broadway Melody was a half-sister to the dam of the King's Stand Stakes winner African Song and a distant relative of the Prix de l'Arc de Triomphe winner Marienbard. The filly was acquired by Daniel Wildenstein and was sent to France to be trained by the Argentinian Angel Penna Sr.

Racing career

1974: two-year-old season
Broadway Dancer made a successful racecourse debut at Chantilly Racecourse in June when she was an impressive winner of  maiden race over 1100 metres. She was then moved up sharply in class and matched against colts in the Group One Prix Robert Papin over the same distance at Maisons-Laffitte Racecourse on 28 July. Ridden by Yves Saint-Martin she started at odds of 7/2 and finished second, beaten a neck by the colt Sky Commander. On 18 August, at Deauville Racecourse, faced Sky Commander again in the Prix Morny. Partnered again by Saint-Martin she started the 4.7/1 second favourite behind the Prix Yacowlef winner Free Round, Broadway Dancer was restrained in the early stages before drawing alongside the leaders 200 metres from the finish, before accelerating away from her rival and winning by six lengths from Princesse Lee. Broadway Dancer did not race again in 1974.

1975: three-year-old season
On her first appearance as a three-year-old, Broadway Dancer started the 4/5 favourite for the Poule d'Essai des Pouliches over 1600 metres at Longchamp Racecourse  on 4 May. Racing for the first time in eight months, she finished third of the ten runners behind Ivanjica and Nobiliary. Three weeks later, the filly was moved up in distance for the Prix Saint-Alary over 2000 metres at the same course. She again started favourite but finished eighth of the twelve runners behind Nobiliary. Broadway Dancer was brought back in distance for the Prix Maurice de Gheest over 1300 metres at Deauville on 3 August. Ridden by the Italian Gianfranco Dettori she finished unplaced behind Sky Commander.

Assessment
There was no International Classification of European two-year-olds in 1974: the official handicappers of Britain, Ireland and France compiled separate rankings for horses which competed in those countries. In the official French Handicap, Broadway Dancer was rated the best two-year-old filly of 1974, two pounds behind the leading colt Mariacci and five pounds ahead of the next-best filly Delmora. The independent Timeform organisation awarded Broadway Dancer a rating of 131, the highest given to any juvenile filly in 1974, but named Cry of Truth (rated 129) as their best two-year-old filly. In their annual Racehorses of 1974, Timeform stated that Broadway Dancer was "likely to prove exceptional". In the official French Handicap for 1975, Broadway Dancer was rated fifteen pounds behind the leading three-year-old filly Ivanjica.

Breeding record
Broadway Dancer became a broodmare for Wildenstein's breeding operations. She produced several foals between 1977 and 1990 but only one minor winner.

Behave (filly, foaled 1977, sired by Brigadier Gerard) failed to win in two races
Bombshell (bay filly, 1979, by Ashmore), failed to win in five races
Bal Royal (bay colt, 1980 by Arctic Tern), won two races
Bonnys Niece (filly, 1982, by Great Nephew)
Belle Bleue (filly, 1988, by Blazing Saddles), failed to win in seven races

Pedigree

References

1972 racehorse births
Racehorses bred in Kentucky
Racehorses trained in France
Thoroughbred family 12-g